John G. Stabler was an associate justice and later chief justice on the South Carolina Supreme Court. He graduated from Wofford in 1905 and then taught Latin in Bamberg County, South Carolina.  He graduated in 1908 from the law school at the University of South Carolina and practiced law in St. Matthews, South Carolina. From 1920 to 1926, he served in the South Carolina Senate until being elected to the South Carolina Supreme Court in 1926, taking his position in January 1926. On March 15, 1935, he was elevated to chief justice and served until his death in 1940.

References

Chief Justices of the South Carolina Supreme Court
Justices of the South Carolina Supreme Court
1940 deaths
1871 births